Foinikas is a former municipality in the Rethymno regional unit, Crete, Greece. Since the 2011 local government reform, it is part of the municipality Agios Vasileios, of which it is a municipal unit. Population 3,266 (2011). The seat of the municipality was in Sellia.

The formed municipality contains the site of the ancient town Phoenix.

References

Populated places in Rethymno (regional unit)